Dermot McGrane is an English association football coach and former professional player.

In 2011 McGrane made the decision to coach for Niagara University's rival, the Canisius Golden Griffins.  McGrane stayed in this position until 2021, when his contract expired.

References

External links
 Canisius profile

Year of birth missing (living people)
Living people
Association footballers not categorized by position
English football managers
English footballers
Elmira Eagles men's soccer players
Lincoln City F.C. players
Canisius Golden Griffins men's soccer coaches
Coastal Carolina Chanticleers men's soccer coaches
Niagara Purple Eagles men's soccer coaches
Western Kentucky Hilltoppers soccer coaches
English expatriate sportspeople in the United States
Expatriate soccer managers in the United States
English expatriate footballers
English expatriate football managers
Expatriate soccer players in the United States
Footballers from Leicester